is a Japanese role-playing video game series, and Nihon Falcom corporation's flagship franchise. The series started on the PC-8801 in 1987. The games take place in a fictional world with some geographical resemblance to Earth, and chronicle the adventures of Adol Christin, a red-haired swordsman, and his companions. Two separate OVA anime series of Ys have also been released, as well as many soundtracks featuring the game's music.

Video games

Main series

Spin-offs

Remakes

Other media

Anime

References

External links 
Falcom's website

Ys
Media
Ys